Conchita Elizabeth Campbell (born October 25, 1995) is a Canadian actress. She is perhaps best known for playing Maia Rutledge on the USA Network series The 4400.

Biography
Campbell was born in Vancouver, British Columbia. She is trained in both ballet and jazz.

Career
Campbell's career started with acting in television commercials at a young age.

Campbell made two guest appearances on CTV's hit show, Cold Squad. She starred in Wilder Days with Peter Falk and Tim Daly in 2003.

She is known for her role as Maia Rutledge-Skouris on the USA channel miniseries and show, The 4400 (2004–2007). There she portrays a returned 'child abductee' who has been missing for decades. When 'returned', she has not aged and is imbued with the psychic ability to foretell the future.

In 2004, she starred in the small indie-film, Pursued, opposite Gil Bellows, Michael Clarke Duncan and Christian Slater. Though she filmed a small role in Bob the Butler, her scenes were deleted. Her feature film debut ultimately came with Scary Movie 4, which set a box office record for Easter weekend 2006.

Filmography

Film

Television

Awards and nominations
For her role of Maia Skouris on the television series The 4400, Campbell was nominated three times for a Young Artist Award: twice in the category of Best Performance in a TV Series (Comedy or Drama) in 2005 and 2007, as well as one nomination for Best Performance in a TV Series (Drama): Supporting Young Actress in 2006.

In 2008 for her guest role of Maggie Thompson on the series Supernatural, episode: "Playthings", she was nominated for a Young Artist Award in the category of Best Performance in a TV Movie, Miniseries or Special: Supporting Young Actress.

References

External links

1995 births
21st-century Canadian actresses
Actresses from Vancouver
Canadian child actresses
Canadian film actresses
Canadian television actresses
Living people